Greensborough Football Club is an Australian rules football club in Greensborough, Victoria, currently competing in the Northern Football Netball League.

History
The Greensborough Football Club was founded in 1893 playing its first game against Diamond Creek.

In 1922 the club became affiliated with the Diamond Valley Football League (DVFL) and were premiers in their inaugural year. Greensborough were 1 of 6 original teams in the DVFL. To date the club has won 17 A grade 1st Division premierships, and been runners up 15 times. Currently, the club plays their home games at War Memorial Park in Greensborough and fields 3 teams in Division 1 each week.

Current status
In recent years the club has achieved success in Division 1 since being promoted from 2nd Division in 2006 after winning Premierships in all three age groups (Seniors, Reserves, Under 19s). In 2010 Greensborough defeated Heidelberg, making it Heidelberg's first loss in 2 and a half years (798 days) and 48 straight wins. The club finally played in a Division 1 finals series in 2011 finishing 3rd after the home and away series and have been very competitive since. The club won the Northern Football League A Grade premiership in 2014 under coach Robert Hyde who had guided the club to premierships in 1983 and 1984.

Club Honours

Northern Football League Premierships

Seniors: (18)

1922, 1925, 1927, 1931, 1934, 1952, 1955, 1958, 1960, 1961, 1966, 1967, 1983, 1984, 1988, 1989, 2006*, 2014

Reserves: (8)

1954, 1961, 1962, 1972, 1984, 2005*, 2006*,  2015

Thirds: (13)

1969, 1970, 1972, 1974, 1979, 1990, 2004*, 2006*, 2009, 2010, 2011, 2014, 2015

*Division 2

Competition Best & Fairest Winners

A Grade
Joe Murphy (1954)
Don McDowell (1958)
Joe Murphy (1961)
Wayne Dobson (1983)
Wayne Dobson (1987)
Peter Mastin (1991) 
Neil Brindley (1991)

B Grade
Graeme Clark (1988)
David Kelly (1989)
Graeme Clark (1990)
Leigh Millsom (2011)

C Grade
Steven Schellenberger (1984)

Competition Leading Goal Kickers
Ray Skals (1957, 96 Goals)
Bruce McDowell (1975, 86 Goals)
Bruce McDowell (1976, 97 Goals)
Glenn Townsend (1985, 103 Goals)

External links

 Greensborough Football Club homepage
 Footypedia
 Northern Football League Website
 Old DV website

Notes

Northern Football League (Australia) clubs
Australian rules football clubs established in 1905
1905 establishments in Australia
Sport in the City of Banyule